Midnight Madness and Beyond is the third album by UK82 Hardcore punk band GBH from Birmingham, UK. It was released in August 1986 on the Rough Justice label (the band's first release for their new label, following the departure from Clay Records) with catalogue number Just 2. Recorded once again at Strawberry Studios in Stockport UK. It was later Re-released with additional tracks (the "Oh No It's GBH Again" EP) in 2002 by leading Punk reissue label Captain Oi! (Ahoy CD 193)

Track listing
 Limpwristed
 Future Fugitives
 Too Much
 Iroquois
 Guns & Guitars
 Horror Story
Midnight Madness and Beyond
 Chance For Living
 The Seed of Madness
 Sam Is Your Leader
 How Come
 Blood

Bonus Tracks
"Oh No It's GBH Again" EP
 Malice in Wonderland
 Lost in The Fog
 Get Out of The City
 Company Of Wolves

References

Charged GBH albums
1986 albums
Captain Oi! Records albums
Albums recorded at Strawberry Studios